is a Japanese former football player.

Playing career
Hirama was born in Shibata, Miyagi, on June 30, 1977. After graduating from high school, he joined the J1 League club Yokohama Marinos (later Yokohama F. Marinos) in 1996. He played many matches from the first season. In 1999, he moved to the newly promoted J2 League club, Montedio Yamagata and became a regular player. In 2000, he moved to his local, Vegalta Sendai. Although a regular player until July, he played many matches as a substitute from July. In 2001, he returned to Yokohama F. Marinos. He played many matches and the club won the champions 2001 J.League Cup. In 2002, he moved to Consadole Sapporo. The club was relegated to J2 from 2003 and his opportunity to play decreased in the 2003 season. In 2004, he moved to Albirex Niigata but hardly played. In 2005, he moved to the Japan Football League (JFL) club FC Horikoshi and, in 2006, to the JFL club Sony Sendai in his local. He played in two seasons and retired at the end of the 2007 season.

Club statistics

References

External links

1977 births
Living people
Association football people from Miyagi Prefecture
Japanese footballers
J1 League players
J2 League players
Japan Football League players
Yokohama F. Marinos players
Montedio Yamagata players
Vegalta Sendai players
Hokkaido Consadole Sapporo players
Albirex Niigata players
Arte Takasaki players
Sony Sendai FC players
Association football midfielders